Valeria Francisca Zalaquett Fuentealba (born 27 November 1971) is a Chilean photographer and portraitist who has worked mainly in contemporary and digital art.

Biography
Valeria Zalaquett has a degree in Philosophy from the Pontifical Catholic University of Chile, an institution where she also took courses in photography and filmmaking. In addition, she complemented her training with a master's degree in Digital Arts at the Pompeu Fabra University in Barcelona.

In her work, a fusion between photography and visual arts can be seen through photomontage and the use of black and white photography "through compositions that interlace different strata of shapes and textures, picking up the new technological resources to translate a language of their own." According to art critic Waldemar Sommer, Zalaquett "uses photography as painting." In particular, it has been observed that her signature "has been the mixture of images, reaching a point where these seem more like paintings. Her photos intervene digitally, as if they were layers of paintings."

Group exhibitions
Zalaquett has participated in group exhibitions at the ArteBA in Buenos Aires (2008), Digital Media Festival in Toronto (2011), in Water at the Amsterdam Photography Biennale (2004), Paisaje, Figura Humana, Bodegón: Una revisión a la Fotografía Chilena Contemporánea at the Chilean National Museum of Fine Arts (2006), and Video "8 tries, Parrilla at the Centro Cultural Matucana 100 (2005).

Awards
In 1997 she received the  Award for her work in lighting design for Sexo, Drogas y Rock & Roll.

References

External links
 

1971 births
Living people
21st-century Chilean women artists
21st-century women photographers
Artists from Santiago
Chilean photographers
Pompeu Fabra University alumni
Pontifical Catholic University of Chile alumni
Portrait photographers
Women digital artists